Ivan Tatomirović (born 11 January 1989) is a Serbian professional footballer.

Career
Tatomirović started his career at second tier FK Srem before transferring to Bosnian Premier League side FK Sarajevo in January 2012. With Sarajevo he won the Premier League of Bosnia and Herzegovina in 2015 and earlier on, the Bosnian Cup in 2014. He left Sarajevo in December 2015.

In February 2016, Tatomirović signed a one-year plus an option year contract with Finnish club HJK Helsinki. He left Helsinki after the end of the season in 2016. On 29 March 2017, Tatomirović signed a one-year contract with RoPS Rovaniemi. He left the club in October 2017.

On 30 October 2017, IFK Mariehamn announced the signing of Tatomirović on a two-year contract for the 2018 season. He left Mariehamn on 4 January 2019. On 7 January 2019, he signed with Croatian First Football League club NK Inter Zaprešić on a free transfer.

In February 2020, he joined Lithuanian club FK Žalgiris.

Personal life
He is the son-in-law of fellow professional footballer Predrag Pašić.

Career statistics

Club

Honours
Sarajevo 
Bosnian Premier League: 2014–15
Bosnian Cup: 2013–14

Žalgiris
A Lyga: 2020, 2021, 2022
LFF Cup: 2021, 2022
Lithuanian Supercup: 2020

References

External links

Association football central defenders
Serbian footballers
1989 births
Living people
Footballers from Belgrade
Serbian expatriate footballers
FK Srem players
FK Sarajevo players
Helsingin Jalkapalloklubi players
Rovaniemen Palloseura players
IFK Mariehamn players
NK Inter Zaprešić players
FK Žalgiris players
Expatriate footballers in Finland
Expatriate footballers in Croatia
Veikkausliiga players
Croatian Football League players